Events in the year 1991 in Ukraine.

Incumbents 

 President: Leonid Kravchuk
 Prime Minister: Vitold Fokin

Events 

 August 24 – The country declares its independence from the Soviet Union.
 October 6 – Soviet President Gorbachev condemns antisemitism in the Soviet Union in a statement read on the 50th anniversary of the Babi Yar massacres, which saw the death of 35,000 Jews in the country during WWII.
 December 8 – In the Białowieża Forest Nature Reserve in Belarus, the leaders of Russia, Belarus, and Ukraine sign an agreement officially ending the Soviet Union and establishing the Commonwealth of Independent States (CIS) in its place.
 December 12 – Ukraine becomes the first post-Soviet republic to decriminalize homosexuality.

Births 
 29 June - Anton Kukhta, Ukrainian footballer

Deaths

References 

 
Ukraine
Ukraine
1990s in Ukraine
Years of the 20th century in Ukraine